FC San Marcos is a Nicaraguan football team playing in the Nicaraguan Premier Division.

It is based in San Marcos.  Their home stadium is Estadio Leonardo G. Jara.

History
San Marcos won promotion back to the Nicaraguan Premier Division in summer 2013, after an absence of six years.

Achievements
Copa de Nicaragua: 2
 1984, 1995

Performance in CONCACAF competitions
CONCACAF Cup Winners Cup (3 appearances)
1995 – Qualifying stage (Central Zone)
1996 – Qualifying stage (Central Zone)
2002 – Qualifying stage (Central Zone)

Current squad

List of coaches
 Nasser Jérez (2001)
  Luis Diaz (2002)
 Marcos Bodán (2009–)

References

External links
  (wins promotion)

Football clubs in Nicaragua
1982 establishments in Nicaragua
Association football clubs established in 1982